Tancrède Vallerey (born 1892, date of death unknown) was a French writer. He was born in Dunkirk, Nord.

Bibliography
Novels:
 Celui qui viendra (1929)
 L'Ile au sable vert (1930)
 L'avion fantastique (1936)
 Un mois sous les mers (1937)
 Le Manoir de Montsonore (1951)

References

1892 births
People from Dunkirk
20th-century French novelists
Year of death missing
French male novelists
20th-century French male writers